The Kleiner Feldberg with an elevation of  is the second-highest mountain of the Taunus mountain range in Hesse, Germany. The Großer Feldberg is located in its immediate neighbourhood.   

In 1913, a meteorological and geophysical observatory was built there by German meteorologist Franz Linke. In 1988 an astronomical observatory was built on the mountain's top. The source of the Weil River and a small castle of the Limes Germanicus are located at its northern base.

References
 Kümmerly+Frey: The New International Atlas. Rand McNally (1980)

See also
 List of mountains and hills of the Taunus

Mountains of Hesse
Mountains and hills of the Taunus
High Taunus